Alfred Williams George Bewick (25 January 1876 – 15 October 1949) was an English cricketer. He was a left-handed batsman and left-arm fast bowler who played for Gloucestershire. He was born in Hempstead and died in Cheltenham.

Bewick made a single first-class appearance for the side, during the 1903 season, against Warwickshire. From the tailend, he scored a duck in the first innings in which he batted, and five runs in the second.

He picked up one wicket in the match, that of James Byrne.

Sources
Alfred Bewick's Cricinfo profile
Alfred Bewick's CricketArchive profile 

1876 births
1949 deaths
English cricketers
Gloucestershire cricketers
Sportspeople from Cheltenham